Major General Harry Hawkins Vaughan (November 26, 1893 – May 20, 1981) was a senior officer in the United States Army Reserve and a military aide to Harry S. Truman during his time as vice president (1945) and president (1945 to 1953).  He was one of Truman's closest advisors.

Early life and career
Harry Hawkins Vaughan was born on November 26, 1893, in Glasgow, Missouri. In 1916, he graduated from Westminster College in Fulton, Missouri. With the United States' entry into World War I, Vaughan was commissioned second lieutenant in the Field Artillery and was assigned for military training at Fort Sill, Oklahoma.

During the training, Vaughan befriended another officer, future U.S. President Harry S. Truman. They were both assigned to the 129th Field Artillery Regiment within the 35th Division and sent to France. Vaughan participated in the Battle of Saint-Mihiel or the Meuse-Argonne Offensive. He served as a liaison officer and battery commander, and for his service in combat, he was later decorated with two Silver Stars and the French Croix de Guerre.

Vaughan returned to active duty in World War II, was injured in a plane crash in 1943, and was assigned to the staff of the Truman Committee. Truman made him the first vice presidential military aide in 1945; he continued as military aide to the president when Truman succeeded Franklin D. Roosevelt, and remained in the post until the end of Truman's presidency in 1953. When Truman was vice president, Vaughan went to Treasury Secretary Henry Morgentahu and demanded a Secret Service agent be assigned to him. Agent George Drescher became the first Secret Service agent assigned to a Vice President.

In the 1950s, Vaughan was accused of bribery.  In 1951, White House Appointments Secretary Matthew J. Connelly asked legal counsel Max Lowenthal to help General Harry H. Vaughan in "setting up testimony." Vaughan admitted repeated episodes of trading access to the White House for expensive gifts.

Death
Vaughan died at Fort Belvoir, Virginia's DeWitt Army Hospital on May 21, 1981.  He was buried at Ivy Hill Cemetery in Alexandria, Virginia.

See also 
 List of people from Missouri

References

Further reading

External links

 
 

Generals of World War II

1893 births
1981 deaths
20th-century American businesspeople
United States Army personnel of World War I
American football centers
Burials at Ivy Hill Cemetery (Alexandria, Virginia)
Military aides to the President of the United States
Military personnel from Missouri
People from Glasgow, Missouri
Recipients of the Silver Star
Recipients of the Croix de Guerre 1914–1918 (France)
Truman administration personnel
United States Army generals
Westminster Blue Jays football players
Corruption in the United States
United States Army generals of World War II